Steel Plaza station is a station on the Pittsburgh Regional Transit's light rail network, located in Pittsburgh, Pennsylvania. It serves the city's Downtown district and is located at the intersection of Grant Street and Oliver Avenue.  The station consists of an outbound (southbound) side platform and an inbound island platform, with one track for trains to Wood Street and the other for a disused branch line to Union Station. The station has rights to 4.25 acres underground Mellon Green and is accessible by means of a tunnel that connects BNY Mellon Center and the US Steel Tower. It is also the closest station to PPG Paints Arena and the primary station used for the Pittsburgh Penguins' home games.

The busiest station in the system, in addition to being directly connected to BNY Mellon Center and the Steel Tower, it provides access to eastern and central portions of downtown. Major office buildings including the Gulf Tower, 525 William Penn Place, and the Koppers Building are also only a block away, along with the many early 20th-century skyscrapers that make up downtown's inner core. The city's Uptown (commonly known as The Bluff) neighborhood and Duquesne University is also within a short walk.

History
The station is located in what was originally the Pittsburgh & Steubenville Extension Railroad Tunnel, which was opened in 1865.

In 1984, Jane Haskell's work "Rivers of Light" was installed.

The station also features low-level platforms, which were used by modernized PCC cars from 1985 until 1993. These trolleys were used for the 47 Shannon and 47D Drake routes, and were cut off from the downtown light rail tunnels in 1993 when the original Overbrook line was closed for rehabilitation. The low-level platforms exist to this day but are gated off.

Fare collection 
There is no fare collection in the Steel Plaza Station.  Passengers embarking at Steel Plaza may travel free to any of the other stations in the free fare zone–First Avenue, Wood Street, Gateway Center, North Side, and Allegheny.  Outbound passengers pay fares when disembarking.

References

External links 
 
Port Authority T Stations Listings

Port Authority of Allegheny County stations
Railway stations in the United States opened in 1985
U.S. Steel
Railway stations located underground in Pennsylvania
Blue Line (Pittsburgh)
Red Line (Pittsburgh)
Silver Line (Pittsburgh)